County Bridge No. 148 is a historic stone arch bridge located in Westtown Township, Chester County, Pennsylvania. It spans a branch of Chester Creek.  It has a single span measuring 36 feet long.  The bridge was constructed in 1911, of coursed roughly square stone in a camelback shape.

It was listed on the National Register of Historic Places in 1988.

References 
 

Road bridges on the National Register of Historic Places in Pennsylvania
Bridges completed in 1911
Bridges in Chester County, Pennsylvania
1911 establishments in Pennsylvania
National Register of Historic Places in Chester County, Pennsylvania
Stone arch bridges in the United States